is a Japanese footballer currently playing as a goalkeeper for Fujieda MYFC.

Career statistics

Club
.

Notes

References

1996 births
Living people
People from Shizuoka (city)
Association football people from Shizuoka Prefecture
Nippon Sport Science University alumni
Japanese footballers
Japanese expatriate footballers
Association football goalkeepers
J3 League players
Kingston City FC players
Fujieda MYFC players
Japanese expatriate sportspeople in Australia
Expatriate soccer players in Australia